Lesquerolic acid is a hydroxycarboxylic acid that occurs naturally in Paysonia lasiocarpa and other Paysonia and Physaria species. This compound has the R configuration at the alcohol-bearing stereocenter, and it is of the Z configuration at the olefin. Lesquerolic acid is chemically similar to ricinoleic acid, but with two additional carbons at the carboxyl end of the carbon chain. Lesquerolic acid, with other hydroxy fatty acids, has important industrial uses, including making resins, waxes, nylons and plastics.

References 

Fatty acids
Hydroxy acids